Myrrhanda Jones is an American beauty pageant titleholder from Gainesville, Florida who was named Miss Florida 2013.

Biography
She won the title of Miss Florida on July 13, 2013, when she received her crown from outgoing titleholder Laura McKeeman. Jones' platform is support for “Comfort for Kids, Inc.”, a non-profit organization she founded after her sister died in an ATV accident. Jones is a telecommunications major at the University of Florida. She won the preliminary talent competition for  her baton twirling routine in the week prior to the Miss America 2014 pageant, despite suffering a torn ACL and MCL in rehearsal just a few hours prior to her scheduled performance. During Miss America 2014, she performed with a decorated leg brace.

References

External links

 
 
 

Miss America 2014 delegates
Living people
People from Gainesville, Florida
University of Florida alumni
American beauty pageant winners
Miss America Preliminary Talent winners
Miss America's Outstanding Teen delegates
Year of birth missing (living people)